The Courier is a 2020 historical spy film directed by Dominic Cooke. The film stars Benedict Cumberbatch as Greville Wynne, and is based on the true story of a British businessman who was recruited by the Secret Intelligence Service to be a message conduit with a Russian spy source Oleg Penkovsky (played by Merab Ninidze) in the 1960s. Rachel Brosnahan, Jessie Buckley, and Angus Wright also star.

The Courier had its world premiere under its original title Ironbark at the Sundance Film Festival on 24 January 2020, and was theatrically released in the United States on 19 March 2021, and the United Kingdom on 13 August 2021. The film received generally favourable reviews from critics.

Plot
Oleg Penkovsky, a high ranking Soviet official and GRU intelligence officer with access to top secret nuclear information, is disillusioned with Khrushchev's leadership in light of the growing threat of a nuclear war with the United States. He reaches out to the CIA and offers to provide information that could help de-escalate the situation. The CIA and MI6 decide that it would be better not to use an officer and instead have an ordinary businessman act as an intermediary.

They approach salesman Greville Wynne to go to Moscow under the pretense of exploring commercial opportunities. Wynne establishes seemingly normal business relations with Penkovsky and the latter makes arrangements with western intelligence agencies to feed them information. He asks that they continue to use Wynne as their regular courier, reasoning that he will be under the Soviets' radar. Initially opposed to the task, Wynne eventually agrees, partly after CIA officer Emily Donovan emphasizes that his efforts could help prevent a nuclear war and also after Penkovsky visits him at his home and tells him that he is betting his life on Wynne's success.

Wynne uses his business travels to Moscow to regularly carry messages and packages provided by Penkovsky to the CIA. However, this takes a toll on his personal life, where he starts behaving agitatedly, leading his wife to think that he may be having an affair.

Penkovsky learns that the Soviets want to turn Cuba into a nuclear threat to the United States, and relays this information, along with photographs and military plans to the CIA, who eventually verify this using their own intelligence. The Americans are able to use this early lead to their advantage during the Cuban Missile Crisis. However, the Soviets, using their own double agents, realize they have an information vulnerability. In Moscow, Wynne realizes that his hotel room had been searched, but leaves the country before he has a chance to warn Penkovsky.

Worried about Penkovsky's fate should he be left behind, Wynne volunteers against the advice of MI6 to go back to Moscow to help arrange Penkovsky's defection. However, the Soviets, having previously poisoned Penkovsky and searched his belongings while he was in the hospital, foil the plan and arrest both men.

Wynne is sent to prison where he endures harsh conditions which results in his health significantly deteriorating. He adamantly maintains his innocence, claiming that he knew Penkovsky only as a business client, and did not know what was in the packages he had delivered. Several months later, he is allowed a visit from his wife, who tells him that the Soviets have removed their missiles from Cuba, boosting his morale. He also gets to meet Penkovsky in prison while being interrogated, and tells him that his sacrifice was worth it and the two men emotionally clutch hands.

In April 1964, Wynne is released in exchange for the Soviet spy Konon Molody and returns to London. It is also revealed that Penkovsky was tried and executed for treason, and buried in an unmarked grave, but with his family being allowed to live in Moscow. The U.S. and Soviets also establish a communications hotline between their leaders to prevent future nuclear disasters.

Cast

Production
On 1 May 2018, it was announced that FilmNation Entertainment was producing Ironbark, a film about British spy Greville Wynne from a script by Tom O’Connor. Dominic Cooke was set to direct the film and produce alongside O’Connor, Ben Pugh, Rory Aitken, Adam Ackland, Josh Varney, and Leah Clarke. Production companies involved with the film include SunnyMarch.

Alongside the initial production announcement, it was confirmed that Benedict Cumberbatch had been cast as Greville Wynne. In October 2018, it was announced that Rachel Brosnahan, Jessie Buckley, Merab Ninidze, Angus Wright, and Kirill Pirogov had joined the cast of the film.

Principal photography for the film commenced in London on 15 October 2018 and it lasted until 7 December 2018.

Music
Abel Korzeniowski composed the score and Lakeshore Records released the soundtrack on 19 March 2021.

Track listing and credits adapted from Soundtrack.Net.

Release
The film had its world premiere at the Sundance Film Festival on 24 January 2020, under the title Ironbark. Shortly after, Roadside Attractions and Lionsgate acquired U.S. distribution rights to the film. Under the new name The Courier, the film was given an original 28 August 2020 theatrical release in the United States. However, due to the COVID-19 pandemic, it was delayed to 16 October 2020. It was scheduled to be released in the United Kingdom on 30 October 2020. It was delayed again to 19 March 2021, and was eventually released on 13 August 2021.

Reception

Box office 
The Courier grossed $6.6 million in the United States and Canada, and $19.4 million in other territories, for a worldwide total of $26 million.

In its domestic opening weekend, the film grossed $1.9 million from 1,433 theaters in its opening weekend, finishing third at the box office. The film made $1 million in its second weekend.

Critical response
The website's critics consensus reads: "The Courier delivers a rousingly effective old-school spy adventure elevated by a thrilling fact-based story and Benedict Cumberbatch's nervy central performance." On Metacritic, it has a weighted average score of 65 out of 100 based on reviews from 37 critics, indicating "generally favorable reviews". According to PostTrak, 82% of audience members gave the film a positive score, with 62% saying they would definitely recommend it.

The Washington Posts Ann Hornaday gave the film 3 out of 4 stars, saying: "The Courier makes a smart, stylish stand for the kind of old-fashioned period spy thriller that is increasingly being turned into bingeable series for streaming services. Its modesty and carefully managed ambitions define its strong suit at a time when such films are scarcer every day." Peter Debruge of Variety called the film "solid if dull-by-definition espionage story" and said: "[The Couriers] hook is that it's based on true events, and the underlying history deserves to be shared."

Nominations
Merab Ninidze was nominated for Best Supporting Actor at the 2020 British Independent Film Awards.

References

External links

2020 films
2020 drama films
2020s spy thriller films
American historical drama films
American spy films
American thriller drama films
British historical drama films
British spy films
British thriller drama films
Cold War spy films
FilmNation Entertainment films
Films postponed due to the COVID-19 pandemic
Films about the Central Intelligence Agency
Films about the Secret Intelligence Service
Films about the KGB
Films set in England
Films set in London
Films set in Moscow
Films set in the Soviet Union
Films set in Langley, Virginia
Films set in 1960
Films set in 1962
Films set in 1963
Films shot in London
Films about the Cuban Missile Crisis
Lionsgate films
Roadside Attractions films
Drama films based on actual events
Thriller films based on actual events
Spy films based on actual events
Cultural depictions of Nikita Khrushchev
2020s English-language films
2020s American films
2020s British films